The 2013–14 Országos Bajnokság I is the 108th season of the Országos Bajnokság I, Hungary's premier Water polo league.

Team information

The following 14 clubs compete in the OB I during the 2013–14 season:

Regular season

Standings

Pld - Played; W - Won; L - Lost; PF - Points for; PA - Points against; Diff - Difference; Pts - Points.

Schedule and results

Championship Playoff 
Teams in bold won the playoff series. Numbers to the left of each team indicate the team's original playoff seeding. Numbers to the right indicate the score of each playoff game.

Semifinals

1st leg

2nd leg

3rd leg

Szolnoki Dózsa-KÖZGÉP won series 3–0 and advanced to Final.

ZF-Eger won series 3–0 and advanced to Final.

Final

1st leg

2nd leg

3rd leg

4th leg

ZF-Eger won Championship final series 3–1.

Third Place

Diapolo Szeged won series 2–1 and won the Third Place

European competition Playoff

5-8. Placement

1st leg

2nd leg

LACTIV-VasasPlaket won series 2–0 and advanced to Fifth placement matches.

3rd leg

Debrecen won series 2–1 and advanced to Fifth placement matches.

5th Place

LACTIV-VasasPlaket won series 2–1 and won 5th Place.

7th Place

BVSC-Zugló won series 2–1 and won 7th Place.

Relegation Playoff

Relegation Semifinals

1st leg

2nd leg

KSI SE won series 2–0 and advanced to Placement Semifinal matches.

OSC-Újbuda won series 2–0 and advanced to Placement Semifinal matches.

9-12. Placement

1st leg

2nd leg

Széchenyi Bank-FTC won series 2–0 and advanced to Ninth placement matches.

PVSK-Füszért won series 2–0 and advanced to Ninth placement matches.

9th Place

Széchenyi Bank-FTC won series 2–1 and won 9th Place.

11th Place

OSC-Újbuda won series 2–1 and won 11th Place.

13th Place

Valdor Szentes won series 2–0 and won 13th Place.

Season statistics

Top goalscorers
Sources: official website

Top assists
Sources: official website

Final standing

Play-off
The overall winner will play in 2014–15 OB I and the loser one in OB I/B.

Valdor Szentes won series 2–0 and will play in 2014–15 OB I.

References

External links
 Hungarian Water Polo Federaration 

Seasons in Hungarian water polo competitions
Hungary
Orszagos Bajnoksag
Orszagos Bajnoksag
2013 in water polo
2014 in water polo